Tupchi or Toopchi may refer to:
 Tupchi, Afghanistan
 Tupchi, Iran
 Tupchi, Khuzestan, Iran